Elk Dale is an extinct town in Atchison County, in the U.S. state of Missouri. The GNIS classifies it as a populated place, but the precise location of the town site is unknown.

A post office called Elk Dale was in operation from 1875 until 1900. Elk Dale most likely was named for the elk of Dale Township, in which the community was located.

References

Ghost towns in Missouri
Former populated places in Atchison County, Missouri